Ninoy Aquino station is an under-construction Manila Light Rail Transit (LRT) station situated on Line 1. It is part of the Line 1 South Extension Project. The station would be built at Ninoy Aquino Avenue in Santo Niño, Parañaque.

History
The extension will have 8 passenger stations with an option for 2 future stations (Manuyo Uno and Talaba). The project was first approved on August 25, 2000 and the implementing agreement for the project was approved on January 22, 2002. However, construction for the extension was repeatedly delayed until the project was shelved years later.

The plans for the southern extension project were restarted as early as 2012 during the Benigno Aquino III administration and was expected to begin construction in 2014, but was delayed due to right of way issues. The issues were resolved in 2016 and the project broke ground on May 4, 2017. Meanwhile, construction works on the south extension began on May 7, 2019 after the right-of-way acquisitions were cleared.

, the project is 75.3% complete. The extension is slated for partial operations by September 2024 and full operations by second quarter of 2027.

Nearby landmarks
When completed, the station will be nearby the Global Airport Business Park Gate 1 along Ninoy Aquino Avenue and other air cargo logistics provider warehouse such as F2 Logistics. The station is also near Gedcor Square Building, whose tenants are mostly forwarding companies. It is also easily accessible to educational institutions such as Santo Niño National High School, La Huerta Elementary School, and Polytechnic University of the Philippines - Parañaque, Parañaque Central Post Office, and the residential areas of Barangays Santo Niño and La Huerta in Parañaque. This shall be the sole station along Ninoy Aquino Avenue before it crosses over to Dr. Santos Avenue.

Transportation links
The station is accessible to passengers who wish to transfer to road PUVs such as jeepneys and UV Express which are plying the route of Baclaran-Sucat and Sucat-Lawton (or Sucat-Lawton via Mall of Asia) respectively for those who are going to Manila, Pasay, and Parañaque respectively.

See also
List of Manila LRT and MRT stations
Manila Light Rail Transit System

References

Manila Light Rail Transit System stations
Proposed railway stations in the Philippines